Atherton Martin is a Dominican agronomist and environmentalist. He was awarded the Goldman Environmental Prize in 1998, for his efforts on protecting tropical forests from environments threats due to planned large copper mining operations.

References 

Year of birth missing (living people)
Living people
Dominica environmentalists
Goldman Environmental Prize awardees